Andrzej Sokołowski (born 23 November 1948 in Komorzno, Kluczbork County) is a former Polish handball player who competed in the 1972 Summer Olympics and in the 1976 Summer Olympics.

In 1972 he was part of the Polish team which finished tenth. He played all five matches and scored one goal.

Four years later he won the bronze medal with the Polish team. He played all five matches and scored four goals.

External links
profile 

1948 births
Living people
Polish male handball players
Handball players at the 1972 Summer Olympics
Handball players at the 1976 Summer Olympics
Olympic handball players of Poland
Olympic bronze medalists for Poland
Olympic medalists in handball
People from Kluczbork County
Sportspeople from Opole Voivodeship
Medalists at the 1976 Summer Olympics
20th-century Polish people